Herring House may refer to:

Patrick-Carr-Herring House, Clinton, North Carolina
Robert Herring House, Clinton, North Carolina
Needham Whitfield Herring House, Kenansville, North Carolina
Herring House (La Grange, North Carolina)
Troy Herring House, Roseboro, North Carolina